The 1988 United States Senate election in Washington was held on November 8, 1988. Incumbent Republican U.S. Senator Daniel J. Evans decided to retire instead of running for re-election to a full term, after being appointed to the seat in 1983, and won re-election to a partial term that same year. Republican former U.S. Senator Slade Gorton, who had just lost a re-election bid in 1986, won the open seat.

Blanket primary

Candidates

Democratic 
 Mike Lowry, U.S. Representative of the 7th congressional district (1979–1989)
 Don Bonker, U.S. Representative of the 3rd congressional district (1975–1989)

Republican 
 Slade Gorton, former U.S. Senator (1981–1987)
 Douglas J. Smith

Third-party 
 William C. Goodloe (Washington Taxpayer), judge and lawyer
 Daniel B. Fein (Socialist Workers Party)

Results

General election

Candidates 
 Mike Lowry (D), U.S. Congressman of the 7th congressional district (1979–1989)
 Slade Gorton (R), former U.S. Senator (1981–1987)

Results

See also 
 1988 United States presidential election in Washington (state)
 1988 United States Senate elections

References 

Washington
1988
1988 Washington (state) elections